LNBP may refer to:
 1,3-beta-galactosyl-N-acetylhexosamine phosphorylase, an enzyme
 Liga Nacional de Baloncesto Profesional (LNBP), professional basketball league in Mexico